Meredith Godreau is an American singer-songwriter performing under the pseudonym Gregory and the Hawk. Active since 2001, Godreau initially enjoyed independent success with two EPs and a full-length album selling a total of 15,000 copies.

Early life
Originally from Medfield, Massachusetts, Godreau moved to Potsdam, New York, when she was twelve. This was where she learned a number of instruments, including piano, clarinet, oboe, violin and viola before settling on her "$70 Christmas gift": the guitar.

Career
Godreau then took on the pseudonym Gregory and the Hawk in 2003 to avoid being pigeonholed as a singer-songwriter, despite citing her influences as Nick Drake, Liz Phair and PJ Harvey. The name was derived from her brother, Gregory, and his imaginary childhood hawk.

Demo EP
She released her demo EP, including early versions of "Boats and Birds" and "Isabelle". When asked about going by her real name, Godreau responded, "There is no reason for it. But, I’d walk by places and it’d say ‘Playing Tonight – Joe Jones’ and I think that was super-boring and I’d never want to go to that show."

Godreau began playing solo shows in small venues around New England until 2005 when she met Mike McGuire in New York. They played live shows together for several months before the bass guitarist Jeff Ratner and drummer Adam Christgau (both of the New York band Paper And Sand) joined the band. The four of them recorded the Boats and Birds EP.

Boats and Birds EP
In 2006, Gregory and the Hawk self-released the Boats and Birds EP as a home-studio project containing the songs "Isabelle" and "Boats and Birds". Both songs received a great amount of attention on the MySpace social networking website, increasing Gregory and the Hawk's popularity. Soon after the release, the four friends moved apart, and so Godreau began playing live with just Ratner on upright bass, and herself on acoustic guitar and vocals.

FatCat records
In Your Dreams, Gregory and the Hawk's first full-length album, was self-released the following year with Mike McGuire and Susan Ambrose as the only other players. The album received many positive reviews but it was not until a show in Brooklyn that FatCat Records discovered her. Before Gregory and the Hawk was signed, Godreau had already sold 15,000 copies of her demos and full-length album, had 18 pages of cover versions on YouTube, and had several solo shows. As stated by FatCat Records, "[we] discovered our newest signing, Gregory and the Hawk, entirely by accident, whilst out one night at a bar in Brooklyn. An unknown band came on stage and Meredith Godreau began to sing, instantly stunning everyone in the room." A month later, she was in the studio recording her first FatCat single, "Ghost", and first album, Moenie and Kitchi, which were released in September and October 2008, respectively.

In an interview with AU magazine, Godreau was asked about her work with FatCat Records and responded, "I wasn’t really aiming to be on a record label, but now that I am, there have been so many great people that I’ve met in the last couple of years because of it that I would never, ever say that I wouldn’t want to have that. I’m very glad about the people I’ve met, and not necessarily the technicalities of being on a label."

Moenie and Kitchi
In the recording of Moenie and Kitchi, many of the instruments were played by the album's producer, Adam Pierce (Mice Parade), with most vocals and guitars recorded simultaneously in just one take. Gregory and the Hawk took a three-continent tour for this album, taking in support slots for múm, The Album Leaf, Mice Parade, Frightened Rabbit, Asian Kung Fu Generation and other bands. "Moenie and Kitchi was not produced by me... and I really like[d] it, but it wasn’t very personal to me. I wrote the songs but I felt like it was not something I could have made on my own," Godreau told AU. Godreau decided to create her next album back in her own garage and studio.

Leche
Godreau worked on Leche in winter 2009, writing and self-recording, then taking her music to a team of friends, engineers and collaborators including Pierce, as well as Jeremy Backofen (Felice Brothers) and Rob Laakso (Amazing Baby, Diamond Nights, Mice Parade, Swirlies). Godreau wrote, "It turned out the idea behind the album was about traveling all around—both physically and psychologically—and observing many different places, people, and behaviors but always from a detached perspective, never directly involved. Traveling was a major influence on the album, as was personal change and growth." The album was released in Canada and the United States on November 9, 2010, and in the UK and Europe on November 15, 2010.

Come, Now
Godreau's album Come, Now, was released on June 5, 2012. Before its release, three songs were posted on her website, "First Flying V" in November 2011 and "Cause It's Cold" and "Been Too Long" in January 2012 while.

Stone EP
The 6-track Stone EP, was released on November 20, 2012. It contains a heavy use of synthesized sounds, as well as tracks that did not make it on to Come, Now.

On The Orange Mountain
Starting in from August 2016, Godreau released a collection of new work. The project, titled "On The Orange Mountain" is a series of recordings captured in the field, from various locations around the Pacific Northwest. Godreau is funding the project through the crowdsourcing website Patreon. To date, eight of ten tracks have been released.

Discography

Albums
 Self-titled Demos (2005)
 In Your Dreams (2007)
 Moenie and Kitchi (2008)
 Leche (2010)
 Come, Now (2012)
 On The Orange Mountain (2016–17), Digital Only
 Texas Collectious (2018–19) Digital Only

EPs
 Gregory and the Hawk (Demo) EP (2005)
 Boats and Birds EP (2006)
 Huckleberry Cherry and Boules EP (2010)
 Stone EP (2012)
 VDay EP (2017) Digital Only
 Three Weeks No Songs (2020) Digital Only

Singles
 "Ghost" (2008)
 "Olly Olly Oxen Free" (2010)

Compilations
 The Lonesome Call of the... WHPRWHIL, Whprwhil Records (2006)
 Pickathon, Pickathon Roots Music Festival (2006)
 Nano-Mugen Compilation 2009, Ki/oon Records (2009)
 We Will Rise Again, Far Cry 5 Presents: Into The Flames (OST), Ubisoft (2018)

References

Living people
Year of birth missing (living people)
People from Medfield, Massachusetts
Alternative rock guitarists
Alternative rock singers
American alternative rock musicians
American folk musical groups
American folk guitarists
American women guitarists
American folk singers
American rock guitarists
American rock songwriters
American women rock singers
American women singer-songwriters
Indie pop groups from New York (state)
Musical groups established in 2001
Singer-songwriters from New York (state)
Guitarists from New York (state)
21st-century American women